Arctic Lake is a man-made lake located by North Sanford, New York. Fish species present in the lake include pumpkinseed sunfish, black bullhead, rainbow trout, and black bass. There is carry down access located in the park on the northwest corner.

References

Lakes of New York (state)
Lakes of Broome County, New York